The Cathedral of Saint George is a Syriac Orthodox cathedral located in Bab Tuma district, in Old Damascus, Syria. The Cathedral acts as the seat of the Syriac Orthodox Church since 1959. It houses the Syriac Orthodox Patriarch of Antioch, currently Ignatius Aphrem II.

References

See also
 List of cathedrals in Syria
 Mor Hananyo Monastery
 Saint Mary Church of the Holy Belt

Syriac Orthodox cathedrals
Oriental Orthodox cathedrals in Asia
Oriental Orthodoxy in Syria
Cathedrals in Damascus
Syriac Orthodox Church